A School of Infantry  provides training in weapons and infantry tactics to infantrymen of a nation's military forces.

Schools of infantry include:

 Australia
Australian Army – School of Infantry, Lone Pine Barracks at Singleton, NSW.
 France
French Army – École de l'infanterie, at Montpellier, France.

Indonesia
Indonesian Army - Infantry Education Center (Pusat Pendidikan Infanteri abbreviated Pusdikif), at  Bandung, West Java
Indonesian Marine Corps - Marines Infantry Education Center (Pusat Pendidikan Infanteri Marinir abbreviated Pusdikifmar)
 South Africa
South African Army – South African Infantry School, at Oudtshoorn, Western Cape.
 Sri Lanka
Sri Lanka Army – Infantry Training Centre, at Minneriya. 
 Turkey
Turkish Army – Tuzla Piyade Okulu, at Tuzla, Istanbul.
 United Kingdom
British Army – Infantry Training Centre at Catterick; Infantry Battle School, at Brecon, Wales; the former School of Infantry, Warminster
Royal Marines – Commando Training Centre Royal Marines, Lympstone, Devon 
 United States
United States Army – United States Army Infantry School at Fort Benning, Georgia.
United States Marine Corps –
The Basic School (TBS) at Marine Corps Base Quantico, Virginia – (Mission: "Train and educate newly commissioned or appointed officers in the ... warfighting skills required of a rifle platoon commander" and conducts initial infantry MOS qualification training for Marine infantry officers.)
Infantry Officer Course (IOC) also at Marine Corps Base Quantico, Virginia – More advanced infantry training for those newly commissioned officers who are selected to become infantry officers 
School of Infantry (SOI) – (Conducts post-Recruit Training for enlisted Marines in basic infantry and combat skills to ensure that "Every Marine is, first and foremost, a Rifleman" and conducts initial infantry MOS qualification training for infantry Marines.)
 SOI(East) at Camp Lejeune, North Carolina.
 SOI(West) at Camp Pendleton, California.

See also
Individual Movement/Minor Techniques
Recruit training
Military academy
Military Occupational Specialty (MOS) – US Army and USMC job classification